Mussaenda villosa is a species of flowering shrub in the family Rubiaceae. It has orange petals and white bracts.

villosa